Modiolarca, is a genus of medium-sized marine bivalve molluscs in the Family Mytilidae, the mussels.

Species within the genus Modiolarca
 Modiolarca bicolor
 Modiolarca cummingiana
 Modiolarca excavata
 Modiolarca gemma
 Modiolarca impacta (Hermann, 1782)
 Modiolarca minuta
 Modiolarca prisca
 Modiolarca pusilla
 Modiolarca subpicta
 Modiolarca subtorta
 Modiolarca trapezina
 Modiolarca tumida

References
 DiscoverLife
 GBIF
 Powell A. W. B., New Zealand Mollusca, William Collins Publishers Ltd, Auckland, New Zealand 1979 

Mytilidae
Bivalve genera
Taxa named by John Edward Gray